Aramatle-qo or Amtalqa was a Meroitic king.

Dunham and Macadam, as well as Török, mentions that Aramatle-qo used the following prenomen and nomen:
Prenomen: Wadjkare ("Re is one whose ka endures") 
Nomen: Aramatle-qo

Family
Aramatle-qo was the son and successor of King Aspelta and Queen Henuttakhbit. He had several wives:
 Atmataka, her pyramid is located at Nuri (Nu. 55). A heart-scarab belonging to Atamataka was found in Nu. 57.
 Piankhher. Buried at Nuri (Nu. 57)
 Akhe(qa?) was a daughter of Aspelta (and possibly Henuttakhbit). She may have been a sister wife of Aramatle-qo. She is buried at Nuri (Nu. 38)
 Amanitakaye, was a daughter of Aspelta and a sister-wife of Aramatle-qo. She is the mother of King Malonaqen. Buried at Nuri (Nu. 26). Known from a shawabti and other funerary items.
 Maletasen is known from many shabtis. She was buried at Nuri (Nu. 39).

Monuments

Aramatle-qo is primarily attested by his pyramid Nu 9 in Nuri which dates to the end of the 6th or the 5th century BC.  A votive object bearing his name originates from Meroe. A piece of jewelry from Aramatle-qo's pyramid, a gold collar necklace which bears his name, was found here. It may have belonged to the king himself or to one of his courtiers.

References

External links

Aramatle-qo

6th-century BC monarchs of Kush
6th-century BC rulers
5th-century BC rulers